This is a list of books in computational geometry.
There are two major, largely nonoverlapping categories:
Combinatorial computational geometry, which deals with collections of discrete objects or defined in discrete terms: points, lines, polygons, polytopes, etc., and algorithms of discrete/combinatorial character are used
Numerical computational geometry, also known as geometric modeling and computer-aided geometric design (CAGD), which deals with modelling of shapes of real-life objects in terms of curves and surfaces with algebraic representation.

Combinatorial computational geometry

General-purpose textbooks
 
The book is the first comprehensive monograph on the level of a graduate textbook to systematically cover the fundamental aspects of the emerging discipline of computational geometry. It is written by founders of the field and the first edition covered all major developments in the preceding 10 years. In the aspect of comprehensiveness it was preceded only by the 1984 survey paper, Lee, D, T., Preparata, F. P. : "Computational geometry - a survey". IEEE Trans. on Computers. Vol. 33, No. 12, pp. 1072–1101 (1984). It is focused on two-dimensional problems, but also has digressions into higher dimensions.
The initial core of the book was M.I.Shamos' doctoral dissertation, which was suggested to turn into a book by a yet another pioneer in the field, Ronald Graham.
The introduction covers the history of the field, basic data structures, and necessary notions from the theory of computation and geometry.
The subsequent sections cover geometric searching (point location, range searching), convex hull computation, proximity-related problems (closest points, computation and applications of the Voronoi diagram, Euclidean minimum spanning tree, triangulations, etc.), geometric intersection problems, algorithms for sets of isothetic rectangles
 
The monograph is a rather advanced exposition of problems and approaches in computational geometry focused on the role of hyperplane arrangements, which are shown to constitute a basic underlying combinatorial-geometric structure in certain areas of the field. The primary target audience are active theoretical researchers in the field, rather than application developers. Unlike most of books in computational geometry focused on 2- and 3-dimensional problems (where most applications of computational geometry are), the book aims to treat its subject in the general multi-dimensional setting.
 
The textbook provides an introduction to computation geometry from the point of view of practical applications. Starting with an introduction chapter, each of the 15 remaining ones formulates a real application problem, formulates an underlying geometrical problem, and discusses techniques of computational geometry useful for its solution, with algorithms provided in pseudocode. The book treats mostly 2- and 3-dimensional geometry. The goal of the book is to provide a comprehensive introduction into methods and approached, rather than the cutting edge of the research in the field: the presented algorithms provide transparent and reasonably efficient solutions based on fundamental "building blocks" of computational geometry.
The book consists of the following chapters (which provide both solutions for the topic of the title and its applications): "Computational Geometry (Introduction)" "Line Segment Intersection", "Polygon Triangulation", "Linear Programming", "Orthogonal Range Searching", "Point Location", "Voronoi Diagrams", "Arrangements and Duality", "Delaunay Triangulations", "More Geometric Data Structures", "Convex Hulls", "Binary Space Partitions", "Robot Motion Planning", "Quadtrees", "Visibility Graphs", "Simplex Range Searching".
 
 
 
 
This book is an interactive introduction to the fundamental algorithms of computational geometry, formatted as an interactive document viewable using software based on Mathematica.

Specialized textbooks and monographs

References

Numerical computational geometry (geometric modelling, computer-aided geometric design)

Monographs

Other

Conferences

Paper collections
"Combinatorial and Computational Geometry", eds. Jacob E. Goodman, János Pach, Emo Welzl (MSRI Publications – Volume 52), 2005, .
 32 papers, including surveys and research articles on geometric arrangements, polytopes, packing, covering, discrete convexity, geometric algorithms and their computational complexity, and the combinatorial complexity of geometric objects.
"Surveys on Discrete and Computational Geometry: Twenty Years Later" ("Contemporary Mathematics" series), American Mathematical Society, 2008,

See also
List of important publications in mathematics

References

External links
Computational Geometry Pages

Computational geometry
Computer science literature
Computational geometry